hakia was an Internet search engine. Launched in March 2004 and based in New York City, hakia attempted to pioneer a semantic search engine in contrast to keyword search engines that were established at that time. The search engine ceased operations in 2014. Since 2015 the domain has been owned by HughesNet.

Hakia was founded by Rıza Can Berkan and Pentti Kouri

The company invented QDEXing technology, an infrastructure to indexing that uses "SemanticRank" algorithm, using ontological semantics, fuzzy logic, computational linguistics, and mathematics. In 2008, hakia added several sub-categories for search engine hits, such as "credible sites" for information by trusted websites, "news", "images" and "meet others", a feature that let users find forums and groups for related search items.

Further reading 
 Tümer, Duygu, Mohammad Ahmed Shah, and Yiltan Bitirim. "An empirical evaluation on semantic search performance of keyword-based and semantic search engines: Google, yahoo, msn and hakia." In Internet Monitoring and Protection, 2009. ICIMP'09. Fourth International Conference on, pp. 51–55. IEEE, 2009.
 Berkan, Riza C., and Victor Raskin. "System and method for natural language processing and using ontological searches." U.S. Patent 7,739,104, issued June 15, 2010.
 Jordan, Jay. "Climbing out of the box and into the cloud: Building web-scale for libraries." Journal of Library Administration 51, no. 1 (2010): 3-17.
 Pollock, Jeffrey T. Semantic web for dummies. John Wiley & Sons, 2009.
 MacManus, R. "Hakia takes on Google. ReadWriteWeb, 23 Mar 2008." (2008).

See also 
List of search engines

References 

Internet properties established in 2004
Companies based in New York City
Defunct internet search engines